The 1961 Los Angeles Rams season was the team's 24th year with the National Football League and the 16th season in Los Angeles.

Off season

NFL draft

Schedule

Standings

References

Los Angeles Rams
Los Angeles Rams seasons
Los Angeles Rams